Sjoerd Hoekstra (born 27 July 1959) is a retired Dutch rower who specialized in the coxless pair. In this event, together with Joost Adema, he won a bronze medal at the 1982 World Rowing Championships and finished in seventh place at the 1984 Summer Olympics.

References 

1959 births
Living people
Dutch male rowers
Sportspeople from Leiden
Olympic rowers of the Netherlands
Rowers at the 1984 Summer Olympics
World Rowing Championships medalists for the Netherlands
20th-century Dutch people
21st-century Dutch people